Park Yu-Hwan (born March 9, 1991) is a South Korean actor.

Early life

On March 9, 1991, Park was born in Seoul, South Korea. His father was a businessman, and he has an older brother, Park Yoo-chun, who is also an actor and singer. 
His family moved to the United States in 1998. They lived in Fairfax, Virginia. His parents later divorced. In 2008, Park returned to South Korea with his mother.
Park's Father passed away on March 14, 2012.

In November 2021, Park was arrested by Korean police for marijuana use in Bangkok, Thailand

Career
Park Yu-Hwan's career started when he was cast as a supporting character in the 2011 MBC's series Twinkle Twinkle. He played the half-uncle to lead actress Kim Hyun-Joo's character, Han Seo-Woo. While still working on Twinkle Twinkle, Park was cast in a small recurring role as Book-Jo in another MBC's series Gye-Baek. In his next acting project, the 2011 SBS's series A Thousand Days' Promise, Park portrayed Lee Moon-Kwon, the younger brother of lead actress Soo Ae's character. His performance earned him a nomination at the 48th Baeksang Arts Awards for Best New Actor. 
 
In 2012, Park Yoo-Hwan landed his first leading role in the Channel A's series K-Pop: The Ultimate Audition, playing Kang Woo-Hyun, the ignorant and bad-tempered leader of boy band M2. He starred opposite Go Eun-Ah, who played a happy-go-lucky girl named Ji Seung-Yeon. In May 2012, Park returned to MBC to star in the new daily drama Can't Live Without You as Kim Min-Do.

Filmography

Television series

Films

Variety shows

Endorsements
HEAD (2011) 
CHRIS. CHRISTY (2011) 
Samsung Galaxy Tab 'The Lovers' (2011)

Awards and nominations

References

External links
 Park Yu-hwan at C-JeS Entertainment

Living people
1991 births
South Korean male film actors
South Korean male television actors
Male actors from Seoul
People from Seoul
Actors from Fairfax, Virginia
South Korean emigrants to the United States
Actors from Seoul